Gabor Steingart (born 1962 in West Berlin) is a German journalist and the author of several popular and influential books. He was the chief editor of Handelsblatt from 2010 to 2018. In 2018, he founded his own media company that issues news, commentaries, and interviews.

Steingart indicates that "freedom of expression is not a gift, it is an obligation. The problem is not the critical journalists, the problem is the harmless ones."

Life 
Steingart was born 1962 in Berlin-Kreuzberg as a son of a Hungarian political asylum seeker and a Berlin woman. He studied political science and macroeconomy at the Philipps-Universität Marburg and at Freie Universität Berlin. Steingart first worked for the economic magazine Corporate Finance and after that for Wirtschaftswoche. He joined Der Spiegel as a business correspondent in 1990 and became its Berlin bureau chief in 2001, a post he held until 2007. He then moved to the United States of America and worked as the magazine's senior Washington DC correspondent. On 5 April 2010, he became the chief editor of Handelsblatt, Germany's leading economic newspaper. He was dismissed by the publisher Dieter von Holtzbrinck in early 2018.

Steingarts Morning Briefing 
Steingart founded "Media Pioneer" in Berlin in 2018. In June 2018, he started to issue a Monday-Friday daily newsletter called Steingarts Morning Briefing in German with a focus on politics and economics. Distributed by email it became quickly the top newsletter in Germany. Since August 2018, he has also issued a daily Der Podcast with commentaries and interviews of people in politics, economics, and culture. As of 2022, Pioneer Media claims to have more than 200,000 newsletter subscribers and over one million podcast listens per week. The venture, which included the launch of the world's first boat built for journalism in 2020, has expanded to include over 30 journalists and plans have been unveiled to launch another vessel, the Pioneer Two.

Works 
Steingart has written several highly popular books. Deutschland. Der Abstieg eines Superstars (2004), in which he criticised the country's lackluster economy and the politicians' inability to reform, stayed on the bestseller lists for months. Steingart was named Wirtschaftsjournalist des Jahres (Economy journalist of the year) in 2004. His next book, Weltkrieg um Wohlstand. Wie Macht und Reichtum neu verteilt werden (2006) was published in 20 countries. A revised version (The War for Wealth) was published in the United States in 2008. The former US Secretary of State Henry Kissinger described the book as "a lucid and compelling reality check". In his Spiegel columns, Steingart was a persistent and abrasive critic of U.S. President Barack Obama.

Critical appraisal in established media 
Steingart's systematic work with catchy metaphors is a characteristic of his journalism, which pursues a specific agenda. His capricious style makes people and ideas big, small or ridiculous, as is common in social media political journalism. Steingart is a well-integrated, prototypical representative of this layer.

According to an article in the German magazine Der Spiegel, hubris is a way of life for Steingart, for whom "it can't be big, fast, powerful, loud enough". This leads to regular scaremongering that can be summed up as "apocalypse daily". Thereby, it sometimes happens that in the heat of the moment he doesn't see the plank in his own eye. In February 2020, for example, he boastfully called for the cancellation of subscriptions to the Süddeutsche Zeitung, the Der Spiegel, the Frankfurter Allgemeine Zeitung and the rest of the 'serious press', because these newspapers had incorrectly predicted that Donald Trump would lose the 2016 US elections. However, Steingart had predicted the same shortly before the said elections.

Steingart's motto, "100 percent journalism, no fairy tales", is reminiscent of the populism of the self-styled "lateral thinkers" against the "lying press", a pejorative political term, used intermittently since the 19th century in political polemics in Germany, that became popular again in recent years during the Corona crisis and the Pegida demonstrations.

Awards 
 2007 
 2012 "Medienmann des Jahres 2012" by Horizont
 2017 "Handelsblatt" under his leadership was named "European Newspaper of the Year" by the European Newspaper Award

Books 
 Steingart, Gabor: Widerspruch unerwünscht. Beobachtungen aus 111 Jahren Fuldaer Zeitung, Petersberg, Zeitdruck-Verlag Möller 1984, 173 S., Ill.
 Steingart, Gabor: Das Konzept der "wissenschaftlich-technischen Revolution" und die Problematik individuellen Leistungsverhaltens in der DDR-Wirtschaft, Berlin, Freie Universität Berlin, Diplomarbeit, 1987.
 Stefan Aust; Claus Richter; Gabor Steingart. Unter Mitarbeit von Matthias Ziemann: Deutschland — Der Abstieg eines Superstars, München, Piper 2004, 279 S., Ill.,
 Steingart, Gabor: Die stumme Prinzessin. Ein Leben in Deutschland, München, Piper 2005, .
 Steingart, Gabor: Weltkrieg um Wohlstand. Wie Macht und Reichtum neu verteilt werden, München, Piper 2006, .
 Steingart, Gabor: The War for Wealth – The True Story of Globalization, or Why the Flat World is Broken, McGraw Hill, 2008, .

References

External links 
 

 Articles by Steingart
 „Kampf dem Raubkatzenkapitalismus!" FAZ, 17. Oktober 2006, von Gabor Steingart – siehe Literatur
 "Raubkatzen vor den Toren des Westens", Deutschlandfunk, 29. Oktober 2006 (Bezugnahme auf Frank Sieren, "Der China-Code")
 "Muss sich der Westen gegen die Chinesen wehren?" Die Welt, 10. Oktober 2006, Streitgespräch mit Otto Graf Lambsdorff

 Articles on Steingart
 "Neuer Machtkampf um die Herrschaft im Spiegel", Die Welt, 20. Dezember 2006
 Analyse der Argumentationsweise Steingarts von Albrecht Müller, NachDenkSeiten, 25. September 2006
 "Aust im Nacken", taz, taz, 31. Oktober 2005, von Oliver Gehrs
 "Arschlochalarm!", taz, die tageszeitung, 17. September 2005, von Tom Schimmeck
 „Droht ein Weltwirtschaftskrieg?", Die Zeit, 19. Oktober 2006, Nr. 43, von Mathias Greffrath
 "Gabor Steingarts Kriegsspiele", Eigentümlich frei, Nr. 67, November 2006, von R. Taghizadegan und G. Hochreiter (Kurzfassung)
 "Weltkrieg um Wohlstand – ein Verriss", Zeit-Blog, 28. November 2006

 Pictures
 Portraits von Steingart, 360-berlin.de

Journalists from Berlin
German male journalists
20th-century German journalists
21st-century German journalists
German non-fiction writers
German business and financial journalists
German people of Hungarian descent
1962 births
Living people
German male writers
Der Spiegel people
People from Friedrichshain-Kreuzberg